Lackawanna City School District is a school district in Lackawanna, New York, United States. The superintendent is Mr. Keith Lewis.

The district operates four schools: Lackawanna High School, Lackawanna Middle School, Martin Road Elementary School, and Truman Elementary School.

Administration 
The District offices are located 245 South Shore Boulevard in Lackawanna. The current Superintendent is Mr. Keith Lewis. The superintendent is Keith Lewis.

Lackawanna High School 

Lackawanna High School (formerly Lackawanna Secondary Center) is located at 550 Martin Road and serves grades 9 through 12. The current principal is Mrs. Deborah Biastre, and the current assistant principal is Mr. Paul Lyons.

History

Former principals 
Previous assignment and reason for departure denoted in parentheses
Mr. Berchmans J. Boland–?-1932 (Latin teacher – Lackawanna High School, named Superintendent of Lackawanna City School District)
Mr. Berchmans Boland–1934-1944 (Superintendent - Lackawanna City School District, retired)
Mr. Edward F. Moss [interim]–1944-1946
Mr. John P. Osborne–1946-1967 (Assistant Principal – Lackawanna High School, retired)
Mr. Harry Doherty–1967-1971 (Assistant Principal – Lackawanna High School, retired)
Mr. Eugene J. Zadzilka–1971-1985 (Assistant Principal - Lackawanna High School, retired)
Mr. Robert J. Liskowski–1985-1987 (Principal – Franklin Elementary School, name Principal of McKinley Intermediate Center)
Mr. William J. Bilowus–1987-2002 (Assistant Principal - Lackawanna Secondary Center, retired)
Dr. Craig Pawlak–2002-2005 (Director of Guidance – Lackawanna High School, named Principal of Clyde-Savannah Junior/Senior High School)
Mr. Peter A. Hazzan–2005-2009 (Principal - Turner-Carroll High School, named Supervisor of Adult/Continuing Education at Genesee Valley Educational Partnership)
Mr. Stephen A. Dimitroff–2009-2012 (Assistant Principal – Sweet Home High School, named Assistant Principal/Director of Athletics of Akron Junior/Senior High School)
Mr. Bruce R. Axelson–2012-2018 (Principal - Lackawanna Middle School, named Principal of Technology of Lackawanna City School District)

Selected former assistant principals 
Previous assignment and reason for departure denoted in parentheses
Mr. Edward A. Gunn
Mr. Leo A. Joyce–1932-? (Science teacher - Lackawanna High School, unknown)
Mr. John Osborne
Mr. Edward Moss
Mr. Celestine A. Shea
Mr. Clinton C. Couhig
Mr. Harry Doherty–1958-1967 (Athletic Director - Lackawanna City School District, named Principal of Lackawanna High School)
Mr. Robert K. Hasler–?-1967
Mr. John J. Yoviene–1967-1971 (Teacher - Lackawanna High School, retired)
Mr. Eugene Zadzilka–1967-1971 (Social Studies teacher - Lackawanna High School, named Principal of Lackawanna High School)
Mr. Joseph Gonsiorek
Mr. Mark Balen–1972-1975 (Social Studies teacher – Lackawanna High School, named Superintendent of Lackawanna City School District)
Mr. Robert W. Miller–1972-1996 (Math teacher - Cleveland Hill High School, retired)
Mr. Robert T. Empric–?-1987 (Assistant Principal – Truman Elementary School, named Assistant Principal of McKinley School)
Mr. William Bilowus–1986-1987 (Physical Education teacher - Lackawanna High School, named Principal of Lackawanna Secondary Center)
Mr. Ronald A. Wisher–1987-1991 (Grade 6 teacher – Truman School, named Principal of West Middle School)
Mr. Michael Jakubowski–1987-1993 (Math teacher - Lackawanna Secondary Center, named Principal of Truman Elementary School)
Ms. Linda E. Cipriano–1993 (Director of Personnel/Purchasing - Lackawanna City School District, named Principal of Personnel, Curriculum and Staff Development of Lackawanna City Schools)
Mr. Michael Jakubowski–1993-1997 (Principal - Truman Elementary School, named Principal of Lackawanna Middle School)
Mr. Matteo A. Anello Jr.–2003-2009 (Math teacher – Sweet Home High School, named Chief Information Officer of Lackawanna City Schools)
Mr. Bruce Axelson–2009-2011 (Assistant Principal – Martin Road School, named Principal of Lackawanna Middle School)
Mr. Matteo Anello–2011-2013 (Principal of Technology - Lackawanna City School District, returned to position)
Mr. Jared Taft–2013-2017 (Principal – Martin Road Elementary School, named Principal of Lewiston-Porter High School)
Dr. Andres Arroyo–2017-2018 (Principal - Sweet Home High School, named Principal of Truman Elementary School)

Lackawanna Middle School 

Lackawanna Middle School is located at 500 Martin Road and serves grades 6 through 8. The current principal is Mr. Matteo Anello, and the current assistant principal is Mrs. Julie Clark.

History 
The current Lackawanna Middle School was built in 1986 and opened in 1997, in the old wing of Lackawanna High School. At the time it served Grades 6-9.

Former Principals 
Previous assignment and reason for departure denoted in parentheses
Mr. Michael D. Jakubowski–1997-2010 (Assistant Principal - Lackawanna High School, retired)
Ms. Mary M. Hoffman–2010-2011 (Principal of Federal Programs - Lackawanna City School District, named Principal of Technology of Lackawanna City School District)
Mr. Bruce Axelson–2011-2012 (Assistant Principal – Lackawanna High School, named Principal of Lackawanna High School)
Mr. Matthew M. McKenna–2012-2015 (Director of Athletics – Lackawanna City School District, named Interim Assistant Principal of Veronica Conner Middle School)
Mrs. Bethany Schill–2015-2019 (Principal - William B. Tecler Arts in Education Magnet School, named Principal of the Math, Science, Technology Preparatory School 196 @ 39)
Mrs. Jennifer Maslakowski; 2019-2021 (unknown, resigned)

Bell Schedule

Martin Road School 

Martin Road School is located at 135 Martin Road and serves grades K through 5. The current principal is Mrs. Julie Andreozzi. The current assistant principal is Mr. Bruce Axelson.

History 
Martin Road School opened in 2003, replacing the former Washington and Franklin Schools. It originally served Grades 3-6, before switching to Grades 2-5 for the 2014 school year. Grades K-1 were added in 2016.

Former principals 
Previous assignment and reason for departure denoted in parentheses
Mr. Thomas E. Mazurek–2003-2005 (Principal - McKinley Elementary School, retired)
Mr. Keith E. Kuwick–2005-2008 (unknown, named Principal of Ledgeview Elementary School)
Mr. Jared D. Taft–2008-2013 (Principal - Royalton-Hartland Middle School, assigned to Lackawanna High School)
Ms. Maureen D. Fernandez–2013-2014 (Principal - Truman Elementary School, retired)
Mrs. Julie Andreozzi–2014-2018 (Principal of Special Education - Lackawanna City School District, returned to position)
Mr. Fredrick Hahn–2018-2021 (Dean of Students - Global Concepts Charter School, resigned)
Mr. Matteo Anello–2021 (Principal, assigned to Lackawanna Middle School)

Truman Elementary School 

Truman Elementary School is located at 15 Innerview Drive and serves grades PK through 1. The current principal is Mrs. Ashley Wakelee.

History 
Truman Elementary was built in 1966 for grades pre-kindergarten to 2, but the second graders were moved to Martin Road Elementary at the start of the 2014-2015 school year.

Selected former principals 
Previous assignment and reason for departure denoted in parentheses
Ms. Nellie King–?-1986 (Principal – New Lincoln Elementary School, named Principal of Secondary Curriculum of Lackawanna City School District)
Mr. Nicholas Korach–1986-1990 (unknown, named Interim Superintendent of Lackawanna City School District)
Mr. Michael Jakubowski–1990-1991 (Assistant Principal - Lackawanna High School, returned to position)
Mr. Nicholas Korach–1991-1994 (Interim Superintendent - Lackawanna City School District, named Principal of Special Programs of Lackawanna City School District)
Mr. Michael Jakubowski–1994-1995 (Assistant Principal - Lackawanna High School, returned to position)
Mr. Nicholas Korach–1995-2003 (Assistant Principal - Lackawanna High School, named Principal of Purchasing, Transportation and Records Management of Lackawanna City School District)
Ms. Maureen Fernandez–2003-2013 (unknown, named Principal of Martin Road School)
Ms. Angela McCaffrey–2013-2018 (unknown, named Principal of Curriculum & Instruction of Lackawanna City School District)
Dr. Andres R. Arroyo–2018-2019 (Vice Principal - Lackawanna High School, named Spanish teacher at Middle Early College High School)

Selected former administrators

Defunct schools 
Bethlehem Park School (1928-1977)
Franklin School (1923-2003)
Lincoln School (1925-1988)
McKinley School
Ridge/Hoover Junior High School (1906-1980)
Roosevelt School (1904-1976)
Washington School (1904-2005)
Wilson School (1904-1975)

References

External links

Education in Erie County, New York
School districts in New York (state)